Khabaz is a sub-district located in Al Udayn District, Ibb Governorate, Yemen. Khabaz had a population of 7711 as of 2004.

References 

Sub-districts in Al Udayn District